Benjamin Hockin Brusquetti (born 27 September 1986) is an Olympic freestyle swimmer, who has swum international for both Great Britain and Paraguay (his father is British, his mother is Paraguayan).

Hockin represented Great Britain at the 2008 Summer Olympics in the 4 × 100 m freestyle relay swimming events where his team finished eighth.

He swam for Paraguay at the 2010 South American Games, where he won 3 silver medals and a bronze medal. However, Hockin did not follow the proper steps to switch his sport nationality and has been banned for one year (retroactive to 23 May 2010).

In September 2011, Hockin was named the flag bearer for Paraguayan team at the 2011 Pan American Games in Guadalajara, Mexico.

At the 2012 Summer Olympics, he was Paraguay's flagbearer, and competed in the 100 and 200 m freestyle and the 100 m butterfly.

He competed again in the 2016 Summer Olympics held in Rio de Janeiro in the 100 m freestyle category, and finished 44th.

References

External links
British Olympic Association athlete profile
British Swimming athlete profile

1986 births
Living people
Sportspeople from Barranquilla
British male freestyle swimmers
British male swimmers
Citizens of Paraguay through descent
Paraguayan male swimmers
Olympic swimmers of Great Britain
Swimmers at the 2008 Summer Olympics
Swimmers at the 2011 Pan American Games
Swimmers at the 2012 Summer Olympics
Swimmers at the 2016 Summer Olympics
Swimmers at the 2020 Summer Olympics
Olympic swimmers of Paraguay
Pan American Games bronze medalists for Paraguay
Swimmers at the 2015 Pan American Games
Pan American Games medalists in swimming
Paraguayan people of British descent
British people of Paraguayan descent
South American Games silver medalists for Paraguay
South American Games bronze medalists for Paraguay
South American Games medalists in swimming
Competitors at the 2010 South American Games
Competitors at the 2018 South American Games
Swimmers at the 2019 Pan American Games
Medalists at the 2011 Pan American Games